Paraphlebia zoe is a species of damselfly in the family Thaumatoneuridae. It is endemic to Mexico.  Its natural habitats are subtropical or tropical moist lowland forests and rivers. It is threatened by habitat loss.

References

Calopterygoidea
Endemic insects of Mexico
Insects described in 1861
Taxonomy articles created by Polbot